Ilze Marisovna Liepa (born 22 November 1963 in Moscow) is a Russian ballet dancer and actress. She has been a soloist ballerina at the Bolshoi Theatre since 1981. She was invested with the title of Merited Artist of the Russian Federation in 1996, the People's Artist of Russia title in 2002, and was awarded the State Prize of the Russian Federation in 2003. She won a Golden Mask Award in 2003 for her performance in the ballet production Padaemand. She has also appeared in the films Bambi's Childhood (1985), Lermontov (1986), Parallel Voices (2005), and The Bottomless Bag (2017), and the miniseries Empire Under Attack (2000). She has further authored the books Liepa method. Philosophy of the body. (2012), and Theatrical Sculptures (2014).

References 

1963 births
Living people
Dancers from Moscow
Russian actresses
Russian ballerinas
Russian writers
Recipients of the Golden Mask
People's Artists of Russia
Honored Artists of the Russian Federation
State Prize of the Russian Federation laureates
Russian Academy of Theatre Arts alumni
Bolshoi Ballet principal dancers